Events from the year 2020 in Finland

Incumbents
President: Sauli Niinistö
Prime Minister: Sanna Marin
Speaker: Matti Vanhanen (until 9 June), Anu Vehviläinen (from 9 June)

Events

January
January 27 – Following the developments of COVID-19 outbreak in mainland China, Finland's Ministry for Foreign Affairs advised citizens to avoid unnecessary travel to Hubei province.
January 28 – Finnair announced it would be suspending its five weekly routes to Nanjing and Beijing Daxing until the end of March.
January 29 – COVID-19 pandemic in Finland: 1st confirmed case. A 32-year-old Chinese woman from Wuhan sought medical attention in Ivalo and tested positive for SARS-CoV-2. She had travelled from Wuhan. She was quarantined at Lapland Central Hospital in Rovaniemi.
January 30 – Finland's health officials estimated that up to 24 people may have been exposed to the virus.

February
February 5 – 3 of the 24 people suspected of being exposed have left Finland by this date, and 14 of the remaining 21 have been quarantined.
February 26 – Finland's health officials confirmed the second case, a Finnish woman, who made a trip to Milan and was back in Finland on 22 February, tested positive at the Helsinki University Central Hospital.
February 28 – a Finnish woman who had traveled to Northern Italy, tested positive by the Helsinki and Uusimaa Hospital District and was advised to remain in home isolation.

March 

 March 6 – Blind Channel released their 3rd studio album "Violent Pop".

 March 13 – the remaining part of the 2019–20 Liiga season was cancelled due to the coronavirus pandemic.

April

May

June

July

August 

 August 1 - Prime Minister Sanna Marin married her long-time partner Markus Räikkönen at Kesäranta.

September

October 

 October 21 – The Vastaamo data breach case began with an unknown person or group releasing online some of the data on patients and their histories that they had acquired from the Vastaamo psychotherapy centre. Among the affected were politician Kirsi Piha.

November

December 
 4 December – Three underage boys murdered a 16-year-old boy in an act of protracted violence in Helsinki.

Unknown date
 The Finns Party decides to cut ties with Finns Party Youth due to the perceived ethno nationalist support.

Deaths

January

20 January – Reijo Kuistila, 88, Finnish Olympic equestrian.
23 January – Kalevi Tuominen, Hall of Fame basketball player, coach and executive (b. 1927)
30 January – Jörn Donner, writer, film director and politician (b. 1933)

February

28 February – Stig-Göran Myntti, football and bandy player (b. 1925)

March

5 March – Susanna Majuri, photographer (b. 1978)
7 March – Karri Käyhkö, Olympic swimmer (b. 1937)
11 March – Aarne Kainlauri, Olympic steeplechaser (b. 1915)
12 March – Juha Harjula, Olympic basketball player (b. 1942)
19 March – Max Engman, historian and translator (b. 1945)
26 March – , professor and politician, Liberal People's Party member of parliament 1972–1975 (b. 1935)

April

4 April – Pertti Paasio, politician, Minister of Foreign Affairs 1989–1991 (b. 1939)
5 April – Pentti Linkola, writer, ornithologist and ecologist (b. 1932)
12 April – Mikko Kaasalainen, mathematician (b. 1965)
15 April – Vesa Törnroos, Olympic sports shooter (b. 1982)
26 April – Kauko Juhantalo, Centre Party politician (b. 1942)

May

8 May – Ritva Valkama, actress (b. 1932)
9 May
 Timo Honkela, computer scientist (b. 1962)
 Kari Karanko, diplomat (b. 1941)
26 May
 Johanna Ehrnrooth, painter (b. 1958)
  Jon Hellevig, lawyer and businessman (b. 1962)

June

3 June – Veli Lehtelä, rower, Olympic bronze medalist (b. 1935)
24 June – Gösta Ågren, poet (b. 1936)
27 June – Arja Tuomarila, singer and continuity announcer (b. 1941)

July

12 July – Jarno Sarkula, musician (Alamaailman Vasarat) (b. 1973)
18 July – Jope Ruonansuu, actor, musician and stand-up comedian (b. 1964)
20 July – Mirja Jämes, 95, Finnish Olympic hurdler (1948).

August

14 August – Kalevi Oikarainen, 84, Finnish cross-country skier, world champion (1970), Olympic bronze medalist (1968).
25 August – Erik Allardt, 95, Finnish sociologist, Chancellor of Åbo Akademi University (1992–1994).
28 August – Jan Klenberg, admiral, Chief of Defence 1990–1994 (b. 1931)

September

8 September – Vexi Salmi, lyricist (b. 1942)

October

16 October – Marjatta Väänänen, politician, Minister of Culture 1972–1975, Education 1976–1977 and Social Affairs and Health 1982–1983 (b. 1923)

November

1 November – Tuomas Gerdt, military officer, last surviving Mannerheim Cross recipient (b. 1922)
3 November – Matti Laakso, Olympic wrestler (b. 1939)
5 November – Ossi Runne, trumpeter, orchestra leader and composer (b. 1927)
6 November – Sakari Paasonen, Olympic shooter (b. 1935)
14 November – Osmo Ala-Honkola, Olympic shooter (b. 1939)
20 November – Hannu Lahtinen, Olympic wrestler (b. 1960)
25 November – Paul Nyman, Olympic racing cyclist (b. 1929)

December

11 December – Richard Tötterman, diplomat (b. 1926)
14 December – Seppo Vainio, Olympic ice hockey player (b. 1937)
28 December – Jyrki Heliskoski, football coach (b. 1945)
31 December – Olli Lehto, mathematician (b. 1925)

References

 
2020s in Finland
Years of the 21st century in Finland
Finland